Coupling is a 2007 Greek remake of the British television sitcom of the same title which aired on ANT1.

The show was directed by Stephanos Kodomari, and written by Tina Kampitsi.

The series started being broadcast on November 15, 2007 at 23:00.

The series was then dropped by ANT1 in February 2008 due to low ratings.

Cast

References

External links
 

ANT1 original programming
2007 Greek television series debuts
2008 Greek television series endings
2000s Greek television series
Greek television sitcoms